A tramp is a long-term homeless person who travels from place to place as an itinerant vagrant, traditionally walking or hiking.

Tramp may also refer to:

Entertainment

Film and TV
 The Tramp, an iconic character played by Charlie Chaplin
 The Tramp (film), a 1915 short film in which he appeared
 Tramp, Tramp, Tramp (1942 film)
 Tramp (Lady and the Tramp), a character in Disney's movie Lady and the Tramp
 Tramps (1983 film), a 1983 Austrian film
 Tramps (2016 film), a 2016 American film
 Tramp (EastEnders), a fictional dog in EastEnders

Music
 Tramp (band), a British blues band
 Tramp (Swedish band)
 The Trammps, an early disco band (fl. 1972–1983)
 Tramp (album) a 2012 album by Sharon Van Etten
 "The Tramp" (song), a 1913 song by Joe Hill
 "Tramp" (The Stranglers song), a 1981 song by British rock group The Stranglers
 "Tramp" (Lowell Fulson song), also recorded by Otis Redding and Carla Thomas
 "Tramp! Tramp! Tramp!", an 1864 U.S. Civil War song by George F. Root
 "The Tramps", an art song by Arthur Bliss (1891-1975)

People
 Mike Tramp (born 1961), songwriter/singer
 David A. Trampier (born 1954), artist and writer who sometimes used the pseudonym "Tramp"

Other uses
 Tramp (nightclub), a private, members-only nightclub in London
 Czech tramping, a youth and social-culture movement in Czechoslovakia from 1918 onwards
 Quasar Tramp, a Czech hang glider design
 , a United States Navy patrol vessel in commission from 1917 to 1919
 Tramp, a racehorse in the 1847 Grand National at Aintree
 Tramp boat, a vessel engaged in the Tramp trade which undertakes voyages for hire
 A slang term for a slut in both American and British English
 A commonly used New Zealand term for a hike; see Tramping in New Zealand

See also
 Tramping (disambiguation)
 Tramp stamps (disambiguation)
 Saddle tramp (disambiguation)
 Supertramp (disambiguation)
 Trampin', a 2004 album by Patti Smith
 Trampas (disambiguation)
 TranP, an adherent of Transnational progressivism
 Trump (disambiguation)